St Alban's Church is in Lindsell Road, Broadheath, Altrincham, Greater Manchester, England. It is an active Anglican parish church in the deanery of Bowdon, the Archdeaconry of Macclesfield, and the diocese of Chester. The church is recorded in the National Heritage List for England as a designated Grade II listed building.

History

The first church services in Broadheath were conducted in 1853 in a canal boat on the Bridgewater Canal. In 1871 a school was built and the services were moved there. Building of the church began in 1899. It was designed by the Lancaster firm of architects, Austin and Paley, and opened for worship on 8 November 1900. The vestry and bellcote were added in 1902. St Alban's became a parish in its own right in January 1911. The west end of the church was not finished at the time, the nave having only two bays. It was completed towards the end of the 20th century, the architect being Geoff Worsley, and the additions were consecrated in 2000. In 2008 an immersion font was installed in the nave.

Architecture

St Alban's is constructed in brick with stone dressings, and is roofed in clay tiles. Its plan consists of a nave with a clerestory, north and south aisles, north and south transepts, a vestry, and a chancel. The clerestory has three-light windows, and there are four-light windows along the sides of the aisles. The east window has five lights, and the west wall is blank. The south transept forms a continuation of the aisle, but the north transept is taller, it carries the bellcote, and has its own roof. The vestry has a pyramidal roof.

Inside the church, the brick arcades are carried on octagonal stone piers. In the chancel are a sedilia and piscina, both with ogee-heads. The 2000 extension contains doors leading to offices. The immersion font is "like a narrow swimming pool in the middle of the nave".

See also

Listed buildings in Altrincham
List of churches in Greater Manchester
List of ecclesiastical works by Austin and Paley (1916–44)

References

Church of England church buildings in Greater Manchester
Grade II listed churches in the Metropolitan Borough of Trafford
Diocese of Chester
Austin and Paley buildings
Gothic Revival church buildings in Greater Manchester
Churches completed in 1900
Churches completed in 2000
20th-century Church of England church buildings
Saint Alban's